Admiral of the fleet or fleet admiral is the highest naval rank of the Russian Federation. It is the equivalent of the Soviet naval rank of Fleet Admiral and the present Russian rank of army general. The rank is roughly equivalent to the rank of "admiral" of other nations. Marshal of the Russian Federation is the only superior rank in the Russian armed forces.

List of Russian admirals of the fleet
 Feliks Nikolayevich Gromov (1937-2021); promoted 13 June 1996; retired 7 November 1997; deceased 22 January 2021.
 Vladimir Ivanovich Kuroyedov (b.1944); promoted 21 February 2000; retired 5 September 2005.
 Vladimir Vasilyevich Masorin (b.1947); promoted 15 December 2006; retired 24 August 2007.

References

Russian admirals
Admirals
Military ranks of Russia
Russian Navy

ru:Адмирал флота